John Anthony Portsmouth Football Club Westwood (born 1963) is a notable football fan and supporter of Portsmouth (known as Pompey); his occupation is an antiquarian bookseller. He has featured in books, magazines, on TV and radio, and the National Portrait Gallery, London.

Westwood's appearance has many Pompey-related features, some temporary and some permanent. Westwood has a mixed reception among Pompey Fans and has served bans for bad behaviour.

In 2022, Westwood was interviewed by Nigel Farage on GB News and has been a guest on COPA90 show "The Football Virgin" hosted by Maya Jama.

Background
Born in Liss, Hampshire, Westwood started attending Pompey matches in 1976. As his commitment grew to the club, so too did his range of Portsmouth FC themed accessories. In 1989 he changed his name, by deed poll, from John Anthony Westwood to John Anthony Portsmouth Football Club Westwood and he is the most recognisable Portsmouth supporter.

Appearance
Westwood has 60 Pompey-related tattoos, the club crest shaved onto his head and 'PFC' engraved on his teeth. He can be clearly heard ringing his handbell, to represent the "Pompey Chimes", almost continuously throughout Portsmouth matches. He wears a large stove pipe hat, a blue and white dreadlock wig, an L.E.D. sign showing Play Up Pompey, a badge that says Danger Stupid Person, and also uses a bugle.

Charity and publicity
In 2003 Westwood was featured in the BBC Television Social anthropology project Video Nation.

A photo reportage entitled Fan de foot. So British! by Paris-based photographer Andrew McLeish about men, passion and football, focussing on Westwood, won the French magazine Paris Matchs 2004 "Prix du Public" competition for photography students.

In September 2007 he played in the Premier League All Stars on Sky Sports, playing as a celebrity fan for Portsmouth.

He featured on the cover of Chuck Culpepper's 2007 book, Up Pompey, an American's take on English football fans.

Westwood had an informal interview with Nigel Farage on GB News in 2022, and was a guest on COPA90 show "The Football Virgin" Hosted by Maya Jama.

National Portrait Gallery
In 2008 a portrait of Westwood by artist Karl Rudziak won the Portsmouth Open Art Competition. In February 2009 it was accepted for the BP Portrait Awards exhibition at the National Portrait Gallery in London, where it was on display from June until September. On 28 September 2009 the exhibition began a national tour, starting at the Southampton City Art Gallery. Not surprisingly, the Southampton FC supporters did not give the display a warm welcome. Rudziak commented that during the sittings for the portrait, he began to understand that Westwood's tattoos and costume were not simply an attention seeking display but a way of externalising his deep passion for Portsmouth F.C. and reflecting his inner self.

Behaviour
Westwood was banned from South Coast arch-rivals Southampton's St Mary's Stadium for urinating on seats in the away end and being thrown out of a derby match in 2003 for persistently refusing to sit down when ordered to by stewards. However, he was in the crowd on 13 February 2010, when Portsmouth defeated Southampton 4–1 in the fifth round of the FA Cup, and at the 2–2 draw in the Championship on 7 April 2012.

He served a two match ban for urinating against a wall outside Forest Green Rovers F.C. It was his second match ban of 2022; the first was a three match ban for making lewd gestures towards away fans against Coventry City F.C. Westwood, a season ticket holder, accepted the decision of a two match ban, and said he had let the club down; he was told of his punishment by phone. He was banned from Pompey's draw against Oxford United in midweek and he also missed the home game vs Shrewsbury Town. Cancel culture has been blamed by John Westwood after he was given a three-match ban from watching Pompey.

In early 2023 Westwood received another two match ban he has been banned from the club's next two fixtures after entering the women's toilets at half-time of last Saturday's defeat to Sheffield Wednesday and claiming that he was transgender.

Personal life

Since his father Frank's death in January 2006 Westwood has been a partner in the family bookshop in Petersfield, Hampshire.

In 2007 Westwood  wrote a book, The True Pompey Fan's Miscellany.

In January 2020, the Petersfield Bookshop was featured on many news outlets after it tweeted that it had had no customers that day. Author Neil Gaiman re-tweeted the post to his 2.3 million followers and the bookshop received thousands of pounds' worth of orders.

Bibliography
The True Pompey Fan's Miscellany, Pennant Books (2007),

References

External links
The Petersfield Bookshop

Portsmouth F.C.
Businesspeople from Portsmouth
Living people
1963 births
Association football supporters
People from Liss
Antiquarian booksellers